Mona Grudt (born 6 April 1971) is a Norwegian television presenter, model, editor and beauty queen who was crowned Miss Universe 1990. She is so far the only Norwegian to capture the Miss Universe title.

Miss Universe
She became the clear favorite of the judges, winning the interview and swimsuit preliminaries and all three segments of the semi-finals. During the 1990 Miss Universe competition, she listed herself as "The beauty queen from Hell" as a publicity stunt (because she was born in the village of Hell, located in Stjørdal, Norway; however 'hell' also means 'luck' in Norwegian). Her runners-up were Carole Gist and Lizeth Mahecha, representing United States and Colombia, respectively.

During her reign, she appeared in an episode of Star Trek: The Next Generation as Ensign Graham in the episode "Identity Crisis". Grudt was also the last Miss Universe to accompany Bob Hope on his USO tour.

Mona was the last Miss Universe from Europe to successfully complete her reign until Iris Mittenaere from France was crowned Miss Universe 2016 (Oxana Fedorova of Russia, who was originally crowned Miss Universe 2002, was dethroned).

Life after Miss Universe
Today, Grudt is the editor of the Norwegian wedding magazine Ditt Bryllup (en. Your Wedding). Also, Mona Grudt came in second place in the Norwegian version of Dancing with the Stars, in Norway called Skal vi danse (Shall we dance).

Grudt returned to the Miss Universe pageant in 1994 as a member of the panel of judges. In 2010 she became the host of the seventh Cycle of Norway's Next Top Model which aired in 2011.

References

External links
 Official homepage (resizes browser window)
 

Living people
1971 births
Miss Universe 1990 contestants
Miss Universe winners
Norwegian beauty pageant winners
Norwegian female models
Norwegian women editors
People from Stjørdal
Norwegian magazine editors
Women magazine editors
20th-century Norwegian women